Luke Simons (born 1978) is an American politician from the state of North Dakota. A member of the Republican Party, Simons represented District 36 in the North Dakota House of Representatives. He was elected to the North Dakota House in 2016.

On March 4, 2021, Simons was expelled from the House of Representatives due to allegations that he threatened and sexually harassed women going back to 2017. One week later, he was expelled from the House by a vote of 69-25, the first state lawmaker to be expelled in North Dakota.

References

External links

1978 births
Living people
Republican Party members of the North Dakota House of Representatives
21st-century American politicians
People expelled from United States state legislatures
North Dakota politicians convicted of crimes